William Russell Maloney (October 13, 1929 – November 13, 2018) was a lieutenant general in the United States Marine Corps who served as Deputy Chief of Staff for Manpower for the Marine Corps. He was commissioned in 1951 and retired in 1985.

Born in Pittsburgh, Maloney graduated from Brown University in 1951. He later earned an M.A. degree from Stanford University in 1963 and an M.S. degree from George Washington University in 1970. Maloney also graduated from the National War College in 1970.

Maloney served as an infantry officer during the Korean War, earning a Bronze Star Medal. Designated a naval aviator in 1955, he commanded Marine Observation Squadron 6 during the Vietnam War, earning a Silver Star Medal, two Distinguished Flying Crosses and twenty-one Air Medals.

After his death, Maloney and his wife Virginia "Jinny" (Fellows) Maloney (January 1, 1933 – May 19, 2018) were interred at Arlington National Cemetery on May 22, 2019.

References

1929 births
2018 deaths
People from Pittsburgh
Brown University alumni
United States Marine Corps personnel of the Korean War
United States Naval Aviators
Stanford University alumni
United States Marine Corps personnel of the Vietnam War
Recipients of the Air Medal
Recipients of the Distinguished Flying Cross (United States)
Recipients of the Silver Star
George Washington University alumni
National War College alumni
Recipients of the Meritorious Service Medal (United States)
Recipients of the Legion of Merit
United States Marine Corps generals
Recipients of the Navy Distinguished Service Medal
Burials at Arlington National Cemetery